Stinear Lake is a salt-water glacial lake,  long and  wide, lying immediately east of Dingle Lake on Breidnes Peninsula, Vestfold Hills of Princess Elizabeth Land in Antarctica. It was mapped from air photos taken by U.S. Navy Operation Highjump in 1946–47. It was first visited by an ANARE (Australian National Antarctic Research Expeditions) in 1955. It was named by the Antarctic Names Committee of Australia (ANCA) for Bruce H. Stinear, a geologist at Davis and Mawson Station for several seasons in the period 1954–59.

References

Lakes of Princess Elizabeth Land
Ingrid Christensen Coast